Bérbaltavár is a village in Vas County, Hungary.

Notable people
Ádám Balogh (1665–1711), kuruc colonel
József Festetics (1691–1757), major general of the Hungarian cavalry
Gáspár Nagy (1949–2007), writer and poet

References

External links
 Street map 

Populated places in Vas County